Hanif Baktash PhD (Pashto: ډاکټر حنیف بکتا ش ) is considered as one of the Pashto language's leading contemporary poets and writers.

Life and education
Mohamad Hanif Baktash, an ethnic Pashtun of the Amarkhel tribe, was born on 9 May 1961, in Maidan Shar (30 km far from Kabul). He was married to Meena Baktash (British Broadcasting Corporation BBC). Together, they had two sons.

He started his studies in Mazar-i-Sharif and then continued in Maidan Shar, Kandahar, Helmand and finished Habibia High School of Kabul in 1978. He holds a graduate degree in social science from the Kabul Institute of Pedagogy. He received a PhD diploma in History from the Supreme Attestation Commission of the USSR in 1993 for his thesis titled  "War in Afghanistan: Social – Political Reasons and Consequences”. In the  summer of 1993 he moved to London and as of 2002 he is a British Citizen. During his time in the UK he cooperated as a journalist with the British Broadcasting Corporation BBC in 1998 and 1999. Since 2009 he worked as a consultant for Afghanistan at a consultancy in Hamburg (Germany). Baktash was well versed in several languages (Pashto, Dari, English and Russian). Hanif Baktash died in 2012.

Literary and research works 
In 1976 Baktash won a Pashto poetry prize in Afghanistan which opened his way into Afghan media. His main books include:
 یادداشت هاونوشته ها  : My Note Book (analytical research in Dari) 1984 Kabul Afghanistan
 دځنګله سترګوکې : In the Eyes of Forest (collection of poems in Pashto) 1987 Kabul Afghanistan 
 کله چې لمردخدای ایتونه لولي When the Sun Reads the Verses of God (collection of poems in Pashto) 2009 Kabul Afghanistan
 شعرې که خنجر است : The Poem Which is Sword (collection of poems of young poets including his own poems in Pashto and Dari ) 1983 Kabul Afghanistan
 صدا The Voice (collection of poems of young poets including his own poems in Pashto and Dari) 1984 Kabul Afghanistan

See also

 هېواد Hewad 1976-1977-1978-1987 Kabul /Afghanistan
 انیس  Anis 1976–1987 /  Kabul/ Afghanistan
 میرمن  Merman May 1976 Kabul / Afghanistan
 ژوندون  Zhwandoon Magazine 1976 Kabul/ Afghanistan
 جوانان امروز:دودست بسوی ظا هر شاه Jawanane Emrooz (July 1987)
  "دبکتا ش دشعر ښوونځۍ اوځانګړۍ سبک"  :اکا ډمیسین سلیمان لایق  "The Baktash Poetical School and Special Style": Academician Sulayman Layq; rawzana
 د پښتو د معا صرې شا عرۍ مخکښ بکتاش naweederooz
 The Organ of Afghan Writers Union Klobe Qalam Sweden 2010

References 

20th-century Afghan poets
1961 births
Living people
21st-century Afghan poets